Nicolai Zimmer (1810-1894) was the Danish Inspector of North Greenland from 1845 to 1846. He studied law in Aalborg from 1829, and moved to Greenland in 1842, before being appointed inspector.

His mother Elisabeth was the granddaughter of Frederick Charles, Duke of Schleswig-Holstein-Sonderburg-Plön, through his illegitimate daughter Frederikke. Zimmer's wife Karen was half Greenlandic Inuit.

See also
 List of inspectors of Greenland

References 

1810 births
1894 deaths
19th-century Danish lawyers
Inspectors of Greenland
19th-century Danish people
History of the Arctic